Pithecops hylax, the forest Quaker, is a small butterfly found in India that belongs to the lycaenids or blues family.

Description
Male upperside: brown, in fresh specimens generally uniform, in some slightly paler along a posterior area from base outwards on the forewing. This is more commune in the female than in the male. Underside: milk white. Forewing: a few very obscure specks along the costa, and a postdiscal transverse series of four transversely elongate spots, or short broad lines, pale brown; the spots of the latter arranged two subcostal and two posterior close to the tornal angle; beyond these is a continuous transverse broad brown line that gets paler posteriorly, from costa to dorsum, followed by a subterminal series of similarly-coloured transverse spots, one in each interspace; at the apex these are generally coalescent with the inner brown line; lastly an anteciliary dark brown line. Cilia dark brown. Hindwing: a curved postdiscal series of transverse pale brown spots that terminate at the costa in a prominent large round black spot; a continuous broad pale brown curved line followed by a subterminal dark brown series of spots and an anteciliary line as on the forewing. Cilia white. Antennae, head, thorax and abdomen brown; the antennae spotted with white on the inner side: beneath: the palpi, thorax and abdomen white.

References

External links
List of butterflies of India
List of butterflies of India (Lycaenidae)

Pithecops
Butterflies of Asia
Butterflies described in 1828